Food of war is a multidisciplinary, open, and non-profit artist collective based in London, England. It was founded in  2010; the artist collective brings out, the relationships of power and the political and social implications that exist in a plate of food through different artistic expressions such as performance, sculpture, painting and video.

The work of the collective Food of War has been exhibited in eight different countries, namely the United Kingdom, Ukraine, (Germany), Mexico, Peru, Brazil, Spain, and Colombia.

Members 
Food of War, as an open artist collective, gathers artists from different disciplines and collaborates with external artists in projects related to the relationship violence – conflict.

The collective has two directors: Hernan Barros, who has worked in cinema, television, and visual effects in the United Kingdom and Omar Castañeda, graduated from Central Saint Martins – University of the Arts London (UAL), who has vast experience in fine arts.

They are joined by three artists who have been involved in different projects according to the country where the collective exhibits their work. Among them are Simone Mattar from São Paulo, Brazil, an artist, gastro performer, food designer, and architect; Quintina Valero,  a German, a photojournalist with studies in economy and a long career in journalism in Spain, currently rooted in London; and lastly, Zinaïda, a fine artist from Ukraine.

Exhibitions 
The first massive exhibition of Food of War was the "Clouded Lands", held in the National Art and Culture Museum Complex "Mystetskyi Arsenal" of Kyiv in Ukraine in 2016. Then, the exhibition was moved to Berlin to participate in the Congress Disarm! For a Climate of Peace, and the Centro de Arte Caja de Burgos in Spain, and finally in London. In each country, the artist collective worked closely with local artists to address the Chernobyl disaster and how this event changed the way Europeans eat.

Exhibitions by date 

 November 8, 2014, Aguapanela is my cup of tea, The Container, London
 August 26, 2015, Panela: The New Gold of Colombia, Chalton Gallery, London
 September 24–30, 2015, BSMT SPACE, Dalston, London
 February 23–28, 2016, Justmad 7 Emerging Art Fair, COAM Sede del Arte,  Madrid, Spain
 March 9 – April 16, 2016, Panela: The New Gold of Colombia, Museum of Contemporary Art (MAC) Bogota, Colombia
 April 5–28, 2017, Clouded Lands, Rich Mix, Mezzanine Gallery, London
 May 27 – 9, Clouded Lands, Arsenal de Mystetskyi, Kyiv Ukraine
 February 21–26, 2017, Justmad 8, COAM La Sede del Arte Madrid, Spain
 February 19, 2018, Insect Flesh, Art week in Mexico City, Mexico  
 April 18–4, 2018, Contamination, Art Fair Art Lima, Lima, Peru
 April 4, 2017, Ópera dos Porcos, Rabieh Gallery, São Paulo, Brazil
 November 15, 2019 – February 20, 2020. ¿Paz en las Mesas?. Museum of Contemporary Art (MAC) Bogota, Colombia

References

Further reading 

 El artista Latinoamericano, Omar Castañeda, presenta: “Aguapanela is my cup of tea” Express News. Interview in Spanish by Yohanna Rozo, November 2014.
 Omar Castañeda Discovery Art Now. Article, August 2015
 From Social Phenomena To Social Movement: Food Of War Ten Thousand Years of Gratitude. Interview, September 2015.
 Чорнобильська трагедія: погляд художника ASN. Article in Russian, April 2016.
 Food of War, an art collective with plenty of food for thought. Pressenza. Article by Silvia Swinden, July 2016
 Charlamos con Quintina Valero y Hernán Barros, del colectivo ‘Food of War’ en Justmad8. Brit-Es Magazine. Article in Spanish, February 2017.
 Conoce el trabajo del colectivo FOOD OF WAR Plataforma de Arte Contemporáneo. Article in Spanish by Sara Torres Sifón, March 2017
 Las obras de arte del movimiento Food of War muestran la conexión entre la guerra y la comida Animal Gourmet. Article in Spanish by Sarah del Moral, February 2018.
 Un bocado político Vivir en el Poblado. Article in Spanish, September 2019

External links 

 Official Site Food of War
 Food of War on Facebook
 Gallery of Food of War at Arte Informado
 Gastroperformance "Comida de Guerra"

British artist groups and collectives